All matches were played at the Stade du 4-Août, Ouagadougou, Burkina Faso.

Group A

Results

Final table

Group B

Results

Final table

Tournament Final

Top goalscorers

References

External links
Official Site - https://web.archive.org/web/20090131052428/http://www.tournoiuemoa.com//

2007 in African football
2007
2007
2007 in Ivorian football
2007 in Burkinabé sport